Menlo is a monospaced sans-serif typeface designed by Jim Lyles and Charles Bigelow in 1997. The typeface was first shipped with Mac OS X Snow Leopard in August 2009. Menlo superseded Monaco typeface, which had long been being the default monospaced typeface on macOS. Menlo is based upon the open source font Bitstream Vera and the public domain font DejaVu.

Replacement

Menlo was replaced as the system monospaced font in Mac OS X 10.11 El Capitan in September 2015, with a new Apple-made monospaced font called SF Mono, a monospaced variant of the San Francisco family of fonts that Apple has created as part of its corporate identity. It is not installed as a user-accessible typeface by default, although it is included with and used by Terminal or Xcode.

SF Mono can be installed on macOS by downloading it from the Apple Developer website. Even if it is installed by the user, SF Mono's license agreement is extraordinarily restrictive; it limits use of the font "solely in conjunction with some Apple-branded applications", and it is not allowed to be embedded anywhere. Any other use of the typeface requires written consent from Apple.

See also
Apple typography

References

External links
 
 
Apple Developer website

Monospaced typefaces
Sans-serif typefaces
Apple Inc. typefaces
Macintosh operating systems
MacOS
Typefaces and fonts introduced in 2009
Typefaces designed by Jim Lyles